Lord Spynie is a title in the Peerage of Scotland. It was created on 4 November 1590 for Sir Alexander Lindsay, younger son of David Lindsay, 10th Earl of Crawford. The title became dormant on the death of the third Lord in 1671. (See Earl of Crawford for earlier history of the family).

Lords Spynie (1590)
Alexander Lindsay, 1st Lord Spynie (d. 1607)
Alexander Lindsay, 2nd Lord Spynie (d. 1646)
George Lindsay, 3rd Lord Spynie (d. 1671)

See also
Earl of Crawford
Earl of Balcarres
Earl of Lindsay
Lindsay Baronets

References

Notes

Dormant lordships of Parliament
Spynie
Noble titles created in 1590